Norman Balbuena (born November 7, 1986), better known in his stage name Boobay, is a Filipino actor, comedian and television host. He is best known for appearing in several GMA News and Public Affairs shows (including Unang Hirit) as a co-host. He was also regular in the award-winning comedy-game show Celebrity Bluff as a bluffer or gangnammm along with Edu Manzano, Brod Pete and host Eugene Domingo.

Personal life
Born in the small town of San Narciso in Zambales province, Boobay is the eldest among the four children of Honorio Balbuena, a soldier, and Aquilla Balbuena, a retired elementary teacher. He was in grade school when Mt. Pinatubo erupted in 1991, this caused him and his family to dwell in an evacuation site for two years after their house was destroyed by the eruption. Despite the hardships, Boobay finished grade school in Zambales. He pursued his college education at St. Louis University – Baguio taking AB Communication where he earned a scholarship upon joining the theater group Tanghalang SLU.

Career

Early years
In 2004, Boobay first tried his luck in show business by joining GMA Network's KiliTV Comedy Hunt, a talent competition for comedians. Although he did not win the contest, he made the cut and became one of the top 15 finalists.

Seeing potential in the aspiring comedian, director Cesar Cosme called Boobay for a TV project that year.  Cosme gave Balbuena the screen name “Boobay” because he thought the comedian looked like the sexy comedian Ethel Booba. After that, Boobay had several guestings in Idol Ko si Kap doing character spoofs of Rufa Mae Quinto and Ethel Booba.

After graduating, he submitted a résumé to GMA Network hoping to become a production assistant. It was Cosme who gave him his break when he was referred to become part of Takeshi's Castle with Joey de Leon and Ryan Yllana.

2007–present: Kapuso comedian
Boobay started his hosting stints as a Kapuso in several programs of GMA News TV. He is a recurring host in the reality-lifestyle program Day Off. Boobay was also one of the "anchors" of the satirical newscast television program May Tamang Balita with Ramon Bautista, Maey Bautista and Jinri Park where he hosted the segments "Ang Twit-twit Mo!" and "Bulag na Katotohanan" alongside Maey.

In 2012, Boobay was picked as one of the three major hosts of the new season of Extra Challenge along Marian Rivera and Richard Gutierrez. He then replaced Wally Bayola in the comedy-game show Celebrity Bluff as a "bluffer" or known as celebrity gangnammm in 2013.

It was in 2015 when Boobay joined the cast of Ismol Family where he played the role of Lora the Explorer, the caretaker of "The Bekiry". The same year, he voiced the character of Fulgoso in the 2015 remake of MariMar starring Megan Young and Tom Rodriguez.

Boobay starred in his very first dramatic role when he played the life story of Paul John Presado, the dubsmasher who went viral after posting his video on social media while singing in a jeepney in Magpakailanman: Ang Ganda na 'di Nakikita. It is in the same year when Boobay once again showed his acting prowess in a more serious role in Magpakailanman: Una Siyang Naging Akin with actress Glaiza de Castro.

Boobay is now a co-host of the weekly entertainment news and comedy talk show CelebriTV and a  regular guest in various GMA Network and GMA News TV programs such as Kapuso Mo, Jessica Soho, AHA!, Sunday PinaSaya and others. Recently, Boobay joined the cast of Eat Bulaga's Kalyeserye as Yaya Pak, one of the four applicants of Lola Nidora's new yaya (nursemaid). In 2016, he became the co-host of Yan Ang Morning! with Marian Rivera until its cancellation on the same year, and Unang Hirit until 2018.

He is currently hosting The Boobay and Tekla Show with Super Tekla.

Filmography

Television

Television shows

Drama anthologies

Film

Accolades

External links

References

1986 births
Living people
Filipino LGBT broadcasters
Filipino LGBT journalists
Filipino LGBT actors
Filipino LGBT comedians
Male actors from Zambales
Filipino game show hosts
Filipino male comedians
Filipino male film actors
Saint Louis University (Philippines) alumni
21st-century Filipino LGBT people
Filipino male television actors
GMA Network personalities
GMA Integrated News and Public Affairs people
Filipino television variety show hosts